Parabellum commonly refers to the 9×19mm Parabellum firearms cartridge designed by Georg Luger and introduced in 1902 for the Luger pistol.

Parabellum or Para Bellum may also refer to:

Latin adage 
 Para bellum is Latin for "prepare for war" and is often used within the context of the phrase Si vis pacem, para bellum, meaning "If you want peace, [you should] prepare for war".

Firearms 
 Parabellum MG 14, a 7.92mm-calibre World War I machine gun
 Pistol Parabellum or Luger P08 pistol

Ammunition 
 7.65×21mm Parabellum, a handgun cartridge
 9×19mm Parabellum

Entertainment
 Parabellum (Colombian band), a Colombian extreme metal band
 Parabellum (French band), a French punk and alternative rock band
 Para-Bellum, a Russian group that competed at 2010 Eurovision; see Russia in the Eurovision Song Contest 2010.
 9mm Parabellum Bullet, a Japanese rock band
 "La Parabellum del buen psicópata", a 1989 song by Argentine rock band Patricio Rey y sus Redonditos de Ricota on the album ¡Bang! ¡Bang!... Estás liquidado.
 "Para Bellum", a 2006 song by Hate Eternal on the album Fury & Flames
 John Wick: Chapter 3 – Parabellum, a 2019 American action thriller film
 Operation Para Bellum, an expansion pack for the video game Tom Clancy's Rainbow Six Siege
 Si Vis Pacem, Para Bellum, studio album from South African rock band Seether.

See also

 Parabola, a U-shaped plane curve  
 
 
 
 
 Bellum (disambiguation)
 Para (disambiguation)